Basil Hugh Briggs (1923 – 8 February 1994) was an English Australian physicist, Reader in physics at the University of Adelaide, winner of the Harrie Massey Medal and Prize for outstanding contribution to physics in Australia in 1992.

Briggs was born in Bradford, England, and was awarded a scholarship to the University of Cambridge (B.A. 1942, Ph.D. 1952). He was a Junior Scientific Officer, Telecommunications Research Establishment, in Malvern, Worcestershire, from 1942 to 1946. Then he worked at the Radio Research Group, Cavendish Laboratory, from 1946 to 1961.  At Cavendish, Briggs joined with a small group to develop a mathematical procedure to deduce the horizontal motion of the ionosphere from radar signals detected on spaced antennas (see Journal of Atmospheric and Terrestrial Physics, 56, 831, 1994). Over many years, Briggs refined this correlation procedure, and was clearly acknowledged as a world leader in this area.

The Cavendish Radio Group began winding down in 1961 and Briggs searched for a University post. In 1962, Briggs became Senior Lecturer in Physics, University of Adelaide; a few years later became Reader until he retired. Briggs was a member of the editorial panel for the Journal of Atmospheric and Terrestrial Physics for 25 years.  He is the father of the mathematician Keith Briggs.

References

External links
 Physics World June 1992 Basil Briggs receiving the 1992 Harrie Massey Prize (page 6 of PDF)
 BASIL BRIGGS AND IONOSPHERIC AND SCINTILLATION STUDIES section from Explorers of the Southern Sky: A History of Australian Astronomy by Raymond Haynes
 Medium Frequency Ionospheric and Meteor Observations Using a Large Antenna Array Basil H. Briggs (1971)

1923 births
1994 deaths
20th-century Australian physicists
20th-century British physicists
Alumni of the University of Cambridge
Academic staff of the University of Adelaide
British emigrants to Australia